Egidijus Valavičius (born December 23, 1978) is a Lithuanian mixed martial artist from Marijampolė. A professional competitor since 2000, he has competed for PRIDE FC, Bellator, RINGS, and K-1.

Mixed martial arts career

Early career
Valavičius made his professional debut in August 2000 in the RINGS promotion.  He fought for RINGS in his first seven fights ending with a record of 4 wins and 3 losses.  One of those losses was to future PRIDE Heavyweight champion Fedor Emelianenko.

For the first 12 years of his career, he fought in Japan and Eastern European countries such as his native Lithuania, Poland, Russia, and Czech Republic.  Valavičius made his North American debut in Chicago, Illinois in August 2012.

Bellator MMA
Valavičius made his debut with Bellator MMA in February 2014.  He faced Atanas Djambazov at Bellator 110 and won via knockout due to a knee and punch at 48 seconds in the first round.

In the summer of 2014, Valavičius was announced as a participant in the Bellator Light Heavyweight Tournament.  He faced Carlos Eduardo in the opening quarterfinals at Bellator 121 and won via split decision.  He faced Liam McGeary in the semifinals at Bellator 122 and lost via TKO in the first round.

Valavičius was released from Bellator in August 2014.

Championships and Accomplishments
Bellator MMA
Bellator 2014 Summer Series Light Heavyweight Tournament Semifinalist
Fighting Network RINGS
2001 RINGS Absolute Class Tournament Semifinalist
Sugar Creek Showdown
SCS Light Heavyweight Championship (One time)
Bushido FC
Bushido FC Heavyweight Championship (One time)

Mixed martial arts record

|-
|  Loss
| align=center| 29–12
| Tony Lopez
| Decision (unanimous)
| Sugar Creek Showdown 29: Thunderstruck
| 
| align=center| 5
| align=center| 5:00
| Hinton, Oklahoma
| Lost SWS Light Heavyweight Championship.
|-
|  Win
| align=center| 29–11
| Jeremy Horn
| Verbal Submission (injury)
| Sugar Creek Showdown 28: Shockwave
| 
| align=center| 1
| align=center| 0:56
| Hinton, Oklahoma
| Won SWS Light Heavyweight Championship.
|-
|  Win
| align=center| 28–11
| Yuri Gorbenko
| KO (front kick)
| Big Fight II in Klaipeda
| 
| align=center| 1
| align=center| 3:55
| Klaipeda, Lithuania
|
|-
|  Loss
| align=center| 27–11
| Liam McGeary
| TKO (knees and punches)
| Bellator 122
| 
| align=center| 1
| align=center| 2:10
|Temecula, California, United States
| 
|-
|  Win
| align=center| 27–10
| Carlos Eduardo
| Decision (split)
| Bellator 121
| 
| align=center| 3
| align=center| 5:00
| Thackerville, Oklahoma, United States
| 
|-
|  Win
| align=center| 26–10
| Atanas Djambazov
| KO (knee and punch)
| Bellator 110
| 
| align=center| 1
| align=center| 0:48
| Uncasville, Connecticut, United States
| 
|-
|  Win
| align=center| 25–10
| Dan McGlasson
| Decision (unanimous)
| Flawless FC 3: California Love
| 
| align=center| 3
| align=center| 5:00
| Inglewood, California, United States
|
|-
| Loss
| align=center| 24–10
| Cully Butterfield
| Decision (unanimous)
| Flawless FC 2: Hated
| 
| align=center| 3
| align=center| 5:00
| Chicago, Illinois, United States
|Middleweight bout.
|-
|  Win
| align=center| 24–9
| Eric Hammerich
| Submission (armbar)
| Flawless FC 1: The Beginning
| 
| align=center| 1
| align=center| 0:58
| Chicago, Illinois, United States
| 
|-
|  Win
| align=center| 23–9
| Krzysztof Morzyszek
| TKO (leg kick)
| Bushido HERO'S World GP 2011 Lithuania
| 
| align=center| 1
| align=center| N/A
| Vilnius, Lithuania
| 
|-
|  Win
| align=center| 22–9
| Hendrik Oschmann
| TKO (punches)
| Bushido HERO'S World GP 2011 Lithuania
| 
| align=center| 1
| align=center| 0:13
| Vilnius, Lithuania
| 
|-
|  Win
| align=center| 21–9
| Sergei Sokho
| Submission (triangle choke)
| BUSHIDO FC 2011 IN LONDON Vol.47
| 
| align=center| 1
| align=center| 1:14
| London, England
| 
|-
|  Win
| align=center| 20–9
| Gheorghe Drucioc 
| TKO (punches)
| King of Kings: World Grand Prix 2011
| 
| align=center| 1
| align=center| N/A
| Chisinau, Moldova
| 
|-
|  Win
| align=center| 19–9
| Dmitriy Bulgak
| KO (punch)
| King of Kings: World Grand Prix 2011
| 
| align=center| 1
| align=center| 0:13
| Lublin, Poland
| 
|-
| Loss
| align=center| 18–9
| Malik Merad
| TKO (doctor stoppage)
| King of Kings: World Grand Prix 2011
| 
| align=center| 1
| align=center| N/A
| Vilnius, Lithuania
| 
|-
|  Win
| align=center| 18–8
| Sergy Soha
| TKO (knee injury)
| Hero's Lithuania 2010
| 
| align=center| 1
| align=center| 4:44
| Vilnius, Lithuania
| 
|-
| Loss
| align=center| 17–8
| Attila Vegh
| Decision (unanimous)
| HG: Heroes Gate 1
| 
| align=center| 2
| align=center| 5:00
| Prague, Czech Republic
| 
|-
|  Win
| align=center| 17–7
| Denis Bogdanov
| Submission (neck crank)
| K-1 World Grand Prix 2010 in Vilnius
| 
| align=center| 1
| align=center| 2:14
| Vilnius, Lithuania
| Won vacant Bushido FC Heavyweight Championship.
|-
|  Win
| align=center| 16–7
| Alexander Grebenkin
| TKO (doctor stoppage)
| Bushido Lithuania: Hero's 2009
| 
| align=center| 1
| align=center| 4:20
| Vilnius, Lithuania
| 
|-
|  Win
| align=center| 15–7
| Antoni Chmielewski
| Decision (unanimous)
| Hell Cage Championship: Hell Cage 4
| 
| align=center| 3
| align=center| 5:00
| Prague, Czech Republic
| 
|-
|  Win
| align=center| 14–7
| Jean-Pierre Waflard
| KO (punch)
| Bushido Lithuania: HERO'S 2008
| 
| align=center| 1
| align=center| 0:08
| Vilnius, Lithuania
| 
|-
|  Win
| align=center| 13–7
| Matteo Minonzio
| KO (punches)
| Bushido Lithuania: The Battle Field 2008
| 
| align=center| 1
| align=center| 4:56
| Vilnius, Lithuania
| 
|-
| Win
| align=center| 12–7
| Jason Jones
| Decision (majority)
| HERO'S Lithuania 2007
| 
| align=center| 3
| align=center| 5:00
| Vilnius, Lithuania
| 
|-
| Loss
| align=center| 11–7
| Dmitry Zabolotny
| Submission (armbar)
| International Absolute Fighting Council: Championship Cup
| 
| align=center| 1
| align=center| 2:15
| Moscow, Russia
|Heavyweight bout.
|-
| Win
| align=center| 11–6
| Olexandr Tsurpikov
| TKO (referee stoppage)
| Hero's Lithuania
| 
| align=center| 1
| align=center| 0:41
| Vilnius, Lithuania
| 
|-
| Win
| align=center| 10–6
| Juha Saarinen
| TKO (punches)
| ZST: Prestige
| 
| align=center| 1
| align=center| 3:44
| Turku, Finland
| 
|-
| Win
| align=center| 9–6
| Boris Jonstomp
| Decision (unanimous)
| K-1: World Max Eastern Europe
| 
| align=center| 3
| align=center| 5:00
| Vilnius, Lithuania
| 
|-
| Loss
| align=center| 8–6
|Jair Goncalves
| Submission (rear-naked choke)
| Hero's Lithuania 2005
| 
| align=center| 3
| align=center| 2:55
| Vilnius, Lithuania
| 
|-
| Win
| align=center| 8–5
| Andre Fyeet
| Submission (triangle choke)
| RINGS Russia: CIS vs. The World
| 
| align=center| 1
| align=center| 2:28
| Turku, Finland
| 
|-
| Loss
| align=center| 7–5
| Mikko Rupponen
| TKO
| Fight Festival 14
| 
| align=center| 1
| align=center| 3:47
| Helsinki, Finland
| 
|-
| Win
| align=center| 7–4
| Andre Fyeet
| TKO (punches)
| Shooto Lithuania: Bushido
| 
| align=center| 1
| align=center| 0:45
| Vilnius, Lithuania
| 
|-
| Win
| align=center| 6–4
| Igor Kolacin
| KO (punches)
| Shooto: Lithuania Gladiators
| 
| align=center| 1
| align=center| 0:51
| Vilnius, Lithuania
| 
|-
|  Loss
| align=center| 5–4
| Yasuhito Namekawa
| Submission (guillotine choke)
| PRIDE Bushido 2
| 
| align=center| 1
| align=center| 1:07
| Yokohama, Japan
|Middleweight (93 kg) debut.
|-
|  Win
| align=center| 5–3
| Gela Getsadze
| Submission (guillotine choke)
| Shooto Lithuania: King of Bushido Stage 1
| 
| align=center| 1
| align=center| 1:31
| Vilnius, Lithuania
| 
|-
| Loss
| align=center| 4–3
| Fedor Emelianenko
| Submission (kimura)
| RINGS Lithuania: Bushido RINGS 7: Adrenalinas
| 
| align=center| 2
| align=center| 1:11
| Vilnius, Lithuania
|
|-
|  Win
| align=center| 4–2
| Krzysztof Gerke
| TKO (corner stoppage)
| RINGS Lithuania: Bushido RINGS 5: Shock
| 
| align=center| 1
| align=center| 5:00
| Vilnius, Lithuania
| 
|-
| Loss
| align=center| 3–2
| Chris Haseman
| Submission (armbar)
| RINGS: World Title Series 5
| 
| align=center| 1
| align=center| 3:08
| Yokohama, Japan
| 2001 RINGS Absolute Class Tournament Semifinals.
|-
|  Win
| align=center| 3–1
| Yasuhito Namekawa
| TKO (towel)
| RINGS: World Title Series 4
| 
| align=center| 1
| align=center| 2:18
| Yokohama, Japan
| 2001 RINGS Absolute Class Tournament First Round.
|-
| Loss
| align=center| 2–1
| Andrei Kopylov
| Decision (unanimous)
| RINGS: World Title Series 2
| 
| align=center| 2
| align=center| 5:00
| Vilnius, Lithuania
| 
|-
|  Win
| align=center| 2–0
| Achmed Sagidgusenov
| Submission (armbar)
| RINGS Lithuania: Bushido RINGS 1
| 
| align=center| 2
| align=center| 4:37
| Vilnius, Lithuania
|Heavyweight debut.
|-
|  Win
| align=center| 1–0
| Denis Baykov
| TKO
| RINGS: Russia vs. Georgia
| 
| align=center| 1
| align=center| 18:29
| Tula, Russia
|

References

External links

 Egidijus Valavicius mma record MMA Universe

1978 births
Living people
Lithuanian male mixed martial artists
Light heavyweight mixed martial artists
Mixed martial artists utilizing Brazilian jiu-jitsu
Lithuanian practitioners of Brazilian jiu-jitsu
Sportspeople from Marijampolė